Sokrates Pantelides from Vanderbilt University, Nashville, TN was named Fellow of the Institute of Electrical and Electronics Engineers (IEEE) in 2015 for contributions to point-defect dynamics in semiconductor devices.

References

Fellow Members of the IEEE
Living people
Year of birth missing (living people)
Place of birth missing (living people)
Vanderbilt University faculty